This article contains information about the literary events and publications of 1522.

Events
September 21 – Luther Bible: Martin Luther's translation of the Bible's New Testament into Early New High German from Greek, Das newe Testament Deutzsch, is published in Germany, selling thousands in the first few weeks.
Luo Guanzhong's 14th-century compilation Romance of the Three Kingdoms is first printed, as Sanguozhi Tongsu Yanyi.

New books

Prose
Desiderius Erasmus – Novum Testamentum (Greek Textus Receptus of the New Testament, third edition)
Martin Luther – Against Henry, King of the English (Contra Henricum Regem Anglie)
Adam Ries –

Drama
Niklaus Manuel Deutsch I – Vom Papst und Christi Gegensatz
The World and the Child (Mundus et Infans, published)

Poetry

Thomas Murner – Von dem grossen Lutherischen Narren ("Of the Great Lutheran Fool")

Births
February – Jean de Nostredame, Provençal historian (died c.1576)
June 1 – Dirck Volckertszoon Coornhert, Dutch classical scholar (died 1590)
unknown dates
Joachim du Bellay, French poet (died 1560)
Siôn Tudur, Welsh poet (died 1602)

Deaths
January 25 – Raffaello Maffei, Italian humanist historian and theologian (born 1451)
February 25 – William Lilye, English classical scholar (born c. 1468)
June 30 – Johann Reuchlin, German humanist scholar and poet (born 1455)
September – Gavin Douglas, Scottish poet and bishop (born c. 1474)

References

1522

1522 books
Years of the 16th century in literature